Hagerstown I.O.O.F. Hall is a historic Independent Order of Odd Fellows hall located at Hagerstown, Wayne County, Indiana. It was built between 1880 and 1883, and is a three-story, five bay by seven bay, Italianate style brick commercial building. It has a cast iron storefront on the first floor and a low hipped roof. When constructed it had stores on the first floor and an opera house and Odd Fellows hall on the second and third floors.

It was added to the National Register of Historic Places in 1978.

References

Independent Order of Odd Fellows
Commercial buildings on the National Register of Historic Places in Indiana
Italianate architecture in Indiana
Commercial buildings completed in 1883
Buildings and structures in Wayne County, Indiana
National Register of Historic Places in Wayne County, Indiana